John Elliott Banks (26 May 1903 – 20 October 1979) was a cricketer who played first-class cricket for Wellington from 1924 to 1926.

Banks was born in England and moved to New Zealand with his family in about 1909. A middle-order batsman, his highest first-class score was 76 not out, the highest score of the match when Wellington beat the touring Victorian team narrowly in 1924–25. In November 1925 he was selected in the New Zealand team to tour Australia that summer, but he was unavailable and had to withdraw; he was replaced by Tom Lowry. Later that month, playing for Institute against Wellington, he scored 260, setting a new record for senior club cricket in Wellington. Banks later served as treasurer of the Wellington Cricket Association.

References

External links

1903 births
1979 deaths
English emigrants to New Zealand
New Zealand cricketers
Wellington cricketers
People from Edmonton, London